Drawn to Life: The Next Chapter is a platform game developed by Planet Moon Studios and published by THQ for the Wii. Despite having the same title, it has a different plot compared to the DS version.

Plot
The Raposa Village has been in peace for a long time, until items from the city start disappearing. The mayor, Mari, asks the Creator to draw a new hero for help. Jowee believes that Zsasha (a well-known thief) has stolen the items and gone off to Jangala. The hero and Jowee (who loves adventure) go off to Jangala to find Zsasha, who has been held captive for days by the monkey king. Shadow walkers appear, invading Jangala. After the Hero defeats them and saves Zsasha, the monkey king releases him and gives them a strange mask. Mari realizes Zsasha did not steal the items, leading her to suspect that Wilfre might be the thief. To make sure if Wilfre is alive, Mari sends the Hero (and Jowee) to Shadow City. Soon, the Hero finds the ink factory working again, creating shadows.

The Hero then finds Wilfre's journal, which holds a plot to destroy the Creator. His plan requires: branches from the tree of ages, the eternal furnace, a pen and pencil, and a magic mask. Mari and the other Raposa realize that Wilfre specifically wants to make creation ink to remake the world in his own image. They already have the latter two items, meaning that they just need to find the eternal furnace and branches from the tree of ages in order to stop Wilfre.

Mari sends the Hero to Icy Wastes to find the eternal furnace. While there, a strange shadow creature appears, stealing it. The shadow creature is unknown, but resembles a Raposa girl. After the Hero and Jowee return, they discover that in the Eastern Winds, the tree of ages is in danger. They defeat the shadow creatures attacking it, and the Hero saves the tree.

Mari is happy Wilfre's plan has failed, until Circi reveals that she's Wilfre's wife, and was the mastermind behind the plan after all. She uses the items that the Hero had found to make creation ink and revive Wilfre, but she can't remember what he looks like. She keeps on drawing pictures of him, but they don't resemble him. Frustrated, she throws away the pictures, but they - along with the items used to create the ink - begin to combine, creating a monster that kills her. It then floods the Village with ink. The Hero fights the dark monster in a final showdown, defeating it. The game ends with all of the Raposa celebrating, although their joy is bittersweet.

Reception

The game received "mixed or average reviews" according to video game review aggregator Metacritic.

References

2009 video games
Action-adventure games
Drawing video games
Multiplayer and single-player video games
Planet Moon Studios games
Platform games
THQ games
Video game sequels
Video games scored by Richard Vreeland
Video games with alternative versions
Wii games
Wii-only games